Lacunicambarus acanthura, the thornytail crayfish, is a species of crayfish in the family Cambaridae. It is found in the southeastern United States.

References

Further reading

 

Cambaridae
Articles created by Qbugbot
Freshwater crustaceans of North America
Crustaceans described in 1981
Taxa named by Horton H. Hobbs Jr.
Taxobox binomials not recognized by IUCN